Vara: A Blessing is a 2013 English drama film directed by Khyentse Norbu and starring Shahana Goswami, Devesh Ranjan, Mohamed Adamaly and Rohit Raj. It is first English-language feature film by Bhutanese film director, after The Cup (1999) and Travellers and Magicians (2003). Based on a Bengali short story Rakta Aar Kanna (Blood and Tears) by  Sunil Gangopadhyay, about the daughter of a devadasi, who falls in love with a Muslim sculptor. It was the opening film of 2013 Busan International Film Festival, where it received good reviews.

Cast
 Shahana Goswami as Lila
 Devesh Ranjan as Shyam
 Mohamed Adamaly as Ali
 Rohit Raj as Subha
 Ruvin De Silva as Raju
 Yashodha Suriyapperuma as Basu
 Swaroopa Ghosh as Jyoti
 Geeta Chandran as Vinata
 Kushan Weerasuriya as Vikram
 Dhanushka Nilaweera as Rajindar
 Pankaj Pawan as Prakash

References

External links
 Vara: A Blessing, Official website
 

English-language Bhutanese films
Films based on short fiction
Films set in India
Films based on works by Sunil Gangopadhyay
2010s English-language films